34 kilometr is a rural locality (a settlement) in Sitinskoye Rural Settlement of Imeni Lazo District, Russia. The population was 67 as of 2012. There are 10 streets.

Geography 
The settlement is located in the upper reaches of the Sita river, 51 km northeast of Pereyaslavka (the district's administrative centre) by road. 43 km is the nearest rural locality.

References 

Rural localities in Khabarovsk Krai